Until the Day Breathes and the Shadows Flee was the first EP released by Milwaukee hardcore outfit 7 Angels 7 Plagues. Originally self-released in 2000 in 2003 it was remastered and re-released by Uprising Records. This recording contains early versions of; "A Farewell to a Perfect Score", "Dandelion", and "Silent Deaths, Crowded Lives". Featuring long arpeggiated intro's on the former and latter, and notably rougher guitar distortion. Temo Rios contributed vocals for this release. The instrumental "Until the Day Breathes and the Shadows Flee" and "Sweet Princess Thief" were not re-recorded but used as interludes through the final dates of their reunion tour. Their original self-released demo is highly sought and very rare. There is a difference between the instrumental versions of "Until the Day Breathes and the Shadows Flee".

Track listing

Personnel 
7 Angels 7 Plagues
Kyle Johnson - Bass
Jared Logan - Drums and percussion
Matt Matera - Guitar
Ryan Morgan - Guitar
Temo Rios - Vocals

Production
Will just - recording
Bill Stace - mastering
Alan Douches - remastering

References

2000 EPs